The 2017-18 Ukrainian Amateur Cup season was scheduled to start on August 23, 2017.

The cup holders SC Chaika Petropavlivska Borshchahivka were defeated by Avanhard Koryukivka in round of 32.

Participated clubs

 Cherkasy Oblast: LNZ-Lebedyn
 Chernihiv Oblast (2): Avanhard Koryukivka, Yednist Plysky
 Dnipropetrovsk Oblast (3): FC Kryvyi Rih, VPK-Ahro Shevchenkivka, Hirnyk Kryvyi Rih
 Donetsk Oblast (3): Forum-Avto Kramatorsk, Sapfir Kramatorsk, Yarud Mariupol
 Ivano-Frankivsk Oblast (2): Pokuttia Kolomyia, FC Kalush
 Kherson Oblast (5): Meliorator Kamianka, Kolos Askania-Nova, SC Kakhovka, Druzhba Novomykolayivka, Krystal Kherson
 Khmelnytskyi Oblast: FC Khmelnytskyi
 Kyiv and Kyiv Oblast (4): Dzhuniors Sofiivska Borshchahivka, Chaika Petropavlivska Borshchahivka, DH Shevchenkivske Denykhivka, Rubikon Kyiv
 Lviv Oblast (4): FC Mykolaiv, Yunist Verkhnia Bilka, Rochyn Sosnivka, SCC Demnya

 Luhansk Oblast: Zorya Rubizhne
 Poltava Oblast: Olimpiya Savyntsi
 Rivne Oblast (3): Izotop-RAES Varash, Mayak Sarny, ODEK Orzhiv
 Sumy Oblast (2): Viktoriya Mykolayivka, Ahrobiznes TSK Romny
 Ternopil Oblast (2): Nyva Terebovlya, DSO-Podillya Ternopil Raion
 Vinnytsia Oblast (3): Ahro-Astra Nemyriv Raion, Fakel Lypovets, Svitanok-Ahrosvit Shlyakhova
 Zaporizhia Oblast (2): Tavriya-Skif Rozdol, Metalurh Zaporizhia
 Zakarpattia Oblast: Sevlyush Vynohradiv

Competition schedule

Preliminary round
First games will be played on 23–24 August and seconds on 30–31 August.

|}

Twenty four other teams will join eight winner of the preliminary round.

Round of 32
First games will be played on 13 September and seconds on 20 September. Chaika–Avanhard Kor will play on 10th and 23rd.

|}

Round of 16
First games will be played on 4 October and seconds on 11 October.

|}

Quarterfinals
First games will be played on 11 April and second on 18 April, 2018.

The game Rochyn – Demnya was played on 10 April.

|}

Semifinals
First games will be played on 2 May and second on 9 May, 2018.

|}

Finals
First game will be played on 20 May and second on 10 June 2018.

|}

See also
 2017–18 Ukrainian Football Amateur League
 2017–18 Ukrainian Cup

Notes

References

External links
 Official website of the Association of Amateur Football of Ukraine (AAFU)
 Representing all the participants of the 2017-18 Ukrainian Cup (Представляємо усіх учасників розіграшу Кубка України 2017/2018). Association of Amateur Football of Ukraine (AAFU). 30 August 2017

Ukrainian Amateur Cup
Ukrainian Amateur Cup
Amateur Cup